Faysal Manzoor born on 1 January 1977, at Karachi, Sindh, is a Pakistani drama writer,  producer and story writer. He has written more than 50 drama serials and telefilms, for private channels in Pakistan like Geo TV, Hum TV, Express Entertainment and A-Plus Entertainment.

Early life
He was born in Karachi but few months after his birth, his family shifted to Peshawar where he did early schooling and than moved back to Karachi for pursuing his career. In 2003, he started his writing career with collaboration of Eveready Pictures.

Career
He chose the problems of the Lower Middle Class as a theme for his writing. He mainly focused on woman empowering stories and give rise to such topics in Pakistan drama industry. Till now he has created more than 100 dramas for several TV channels. He has worked on the serials Saaya, Mol, Bholi Bano, Sehra Main Safar and Dil Ishq.

In late 2020, he started working as a content creator for first Urdu Pakistani OTT platform.

Filmography

As writer
Saaya (season 01)
Zamani Manzil Kay Maskharay

As Content Head
Dil Ishq
Mol
Roshni
Silsilay
Tu Mera Chaand (Telefilm)
Bad Naseeb
Roag
Pehchan

References

External links
 Faysal Manzoor Khan-IMDb

1977 births
Living people
People from Karachi
Pakistani dramatists and playwrights
Pakistani television writers
Pakistani television people